Futbolo klubas Širvėna, commonly known as Širvėna, is a Lithuanian football club located in Biržai, center of Biržai District. They played in the II Lyga, Western zone, the third tier of Lithuanian football from 2013 to 2018. In Soviet occupations, it was in Pirma lyga (second tier).

History
Club was created in 1948 as part of the republican sports union "Žalgiris". From 1954 club was renamed "Siūlas" by the sponsorship reasons. 

During the Soviet occupation in Lithuania, the ownership and sponsorship of the club was consistently changing.

The team's "Silver age" was five seasons, year after year, when in 1953, 1954, 1955, 1956, 1957 became runners-up in "B" klasė (second tier) championship.

In 1978 and 1984 seasons in team played currently well known football manager Saulius Širmelis. 

In 1990, the club was resurrected. In 1991 changed name to Širvėna. From 2003 a general sponsor was "Rinkuškiai" brewery. For sponsorship reasons club was renamed to "Rinkuškiai".

In 2013 club come back to II Lyga, Western zone, the third tier of Lithuanian football. 

Before 2015 season head of the club promised fight for medals.

In 2015, the club won the Western zone and had chances play in Pirma lyga (2nd tier), but they stayed in II Lyga.

In 2019 passed any competition and LFF Cup tournament.

What means Širvėna name
Lake Širvėna in Biržai. This lake is not natural. When was built Biržai Castle on the Agluona and Apaščia rivers at their confluence, and the artificial Lake Širvėna, covering about 40 km², was created. Major castle building works were finished in 1589. 

First time club was renamed Širvėna in 1965. Second time in 1991 and last time in 2013.

Historical names
 1948 – Žalgiris
 1954 – Siūlas
 1955 – Kooperatininkas
 1957 – MTS
 1959 – MMS
 1960 – Siūlas
 1963 – Vairas
 1965 – Širvėna
 1968 – Siūlas
 1972 – Statybininkas
 1975 – Nemunas
 1977 – Medis
 1979 – Statybininkas
 1980 – Medis
 1987 – Rovėja
 1991 – Širvėna
 2003 – Rinkuškiai
 2013 – Širvėna

Honours
The club's honours in soviet occupation period (Played in "B" klasė (second tier) and in an independent Lithuania period (since 1990).

Domestic
 B klasė:
Runners-up - 5 
 1953, 1954, 1955, 1956, 1957

Recent seasons team play in II Lyga West Zone championship.

 II Lyga West Zone
 Winners - 1: 2015
 Runners-up - 2: 2001, 2017

Recent seasons

Kit evoliution

Colors 
Black, white and red.

Crest 
 In "Rinkuškiai" period (2003-2012) crest was the same as "Rinkuškiai" brewery`s.
 In 2013 logo was changed. Eagle in logo the same like in flag and coat arms of Biržai town.

Stadium
Club play their home matches in Biržai Stadium (lt. Biržų miesto stadionas). The current capacity of the stadium is 1,000 seats.

Current squad

References

External links
 Official page (lietuvosfutbolas.lt)
 Site du birzai.lt 
 KLFF site (klff.lt)
 siaure.lt 
 Šiaurės rytai - nepriklausomas Biržų krašto laikraštis 

Football clubs in Lithuania
Association football clubs established in 1948